Rudna  is a village in the administrative district of Gmina Złotów, within Złotów County, Greater Poland Voivodeship, in west-central Poland.

The village has a population of 320.

In the interbellum, a Polish school existed in the village. After the German invasion of Poland, which started World War II, Poles were persecuted. The Germans arrested local Polish activists and the local Polish teacher Czesław Mikołajczyk, who were imprisoned and killed in the Flossenbürg and Sachsenhausen concentration camps.

References

Villages in Złotów County